Typhoon Kalmaegi, known in the Philippines as Typhoon Helen, was the seventh named storm and the fifth typhoon that was recognised by the Japan Meteorological Agency. The Joint Typhoon Warning Center also recognised it as the eighth tropical depression, the seventh tropical storm and the sixth typhoon of the 2008 Pacific typhoon season.

Kalmaegi (Helen) formed as a tropical depression on 13 July when it was located to the east of the Philippines. Shortly afterwards it made a direct landfall on Taiwan and then moved into China's Fujan province the next day it emerged into the Taiwan Strait and raced towards North Korea where it became fully extratropical and the last advisories were released.

Meteorological history

Early on July 13, the Japan Meteorological Agency (JMA), began to issue full advisories on a tropical depression, which was located to the east of the Philippines. Later that day PAGASA allocated the name Helen to the depression, followed the next day by the Joint Typhoon Warning Center (JTWC) designating the number 08W. Early on July 15, both the JTWC, and the JMA upgraded the depression to tropical storm status, with RSMC Tokyo assigning the name "Kalmaegi" to the storm, which was submitted by North Korea and is Korean for seagull. Early on the 17th, Kalmaegi began rapidly intensifying; JMA was the first agency to upgrade it into a typhoon. JTWC followed a few hours later. Finally, PAGASA upgraded Kalmaegi (Helen) into a typhoon on later that day.

Typhoon Kalmaegi, which was downgraded to tropical storm status by Taiwan's Central Weather Bureau while still east of the country, made landfall at Ilan County in northeast Taiwan in the evening of July 17 at 19:40 local time (13:40 UTC) and emerged into the Taiwan Strait at 7:20 in the morning local time (01:20 UTC) on July 18. From Taiwan, the typhoon, now downgraded to a tropical storm, turned toward southeast China. In Xiapu County of Fujian Province, the tropical storm made landfall at 17:50 local time (0950 UTC), with winds of about 90 miles per hour.  Early on July 19, the JTWC issued its final advisory on Kalmaegi and downgraded it to a tropical depression.  However, the JMA continued to issue advisories and maintained Kalmaegi as a tropical storm as it moved to the Yellow Sea. Late the next day, the JMA downgraded Kalmaegi to a low (extratropical cyclone) as it moved inland over North Korea.

Preparations

Philippines
PAGASA issued Public Storm Warning Signals for provinces across Northern Luzon from July 14 till the 17th. Initially, PAGASA issued Storm Signal Number 1 over Cagayan, Isabela, Batanes Group of Islands and Calayan Group of Islands. But as the storm tracked nearer to Northern Luzon, more and more are issued Signals 1, 2 and 3. By the afternoon of the 16th Philippine Time, only Batanes was left under Signal Number one. PAGASA issued their last advisory on Helen (Kalmaegi) on 2100 UTC 17 July (5 a.m. 18 July PST).

Taiwan
Several flights in and out of Taiwan were either delayed or cancelled due to the typhoon. All evening classes for the day the storm made landfall were closed however, all classes were scheduled to resume the next day.

Mainland China
Officials in Fujian Province and Zhejiang Province ordered about 61,000 ships to return to port and evacuated an estimated 360,000 people from low-lying areas.

Impact

Philippines
In the Philippines, it passed over Northern Luzon (mostly affecting Ilocos and Cagayan Valley), where it killed two people and injured another. The first fatality occurred after a man drove off the edge of a cliff due to poor visibility. The second was linked to a snake bite following the storm. In all, Kalmaegi (Helen) affected at least 31,129 people throughout 146 barangays in three provinces. Property damages amounted to ₱ 5.6 million. The storm also hit 82 villages (all in Northern Luzon) and caused around ₱1.3 million worth of damage to agriculture. Meanwhile, the storm intensified the southwest monsoon, thus causing torrential rains over the rest of Luzon. The resulting rains thus caused suspension of classes in parts of Metro Manila.

Taiwan

At least 19 lost their lives due to the storm and six were reported as missing. An estimated  of rain fell within seven hours, causing several drainage systems to overflow. Local media reported that an estimate 115,000 people in Taiwan, primarily in Tainan, Nantou County, and Taichung County (now part of Taichung City) lost power during the storm. The storm caused NT$ 300 million (US$15.1 million) worth of damage, and destroyed about 5,100 hectares of orchards and crops. Agricultural losses amounted to $300 million (USD).

Mainland China
In Xiapu County of Fujian Province and in neighboring Zhejiang Province, 360,000 residents left coastal and low-lying homes to escape the storm. Schools and many businesses remained closed, and the storm was expected to travel northwest.

Republic of Korea
One dam, the Paldang-Dam had to discharge water at a rate of 4,817 m3 (170,110 ft3) per second. Eight levees were breached, with a total length of 105 m (344 ft), due to rising rivers, flooding 93 homes and 87.58 hectares (216.4 acres) of farmland. Rains also caused landslide which covered an area of 0.6 hectares (1.4 acres) and washed out a small bridge. Four people were killed, another was listed as missing, and a total of 271 were affected by the storm.

Japan

Russia
After moving through the Sea of Japan, the remnants of Kalmaegi brought significant rainfall and strong winds to parts of eastern Russia. Several rivers in Primorsky were reportedly near flood stage as the storm passed through. Offshore, Several ships were stranded during the storm and sent out distress signals.

Aftermath

Philippines
Relief goods, worth ₱138,744 were sent to affected areas within region one.

Taiwan
Government officials in Taiwan enacted a large rescue operation involving over 60,000 civilian and government rescue workers. Following the severe flooding in Taiwan, officials in Mainland China were willing to send fresh vegetables whenever needed.

Naming
The name Kalmaegi was submitted to the World Meteorological Organisation's Typhoon Committee by North Korea and was one of the original names submitted for use from January 1, 2000. The name Kalmaegi is Korean for a seagull which is a type of bird which lives by the sea.

See also

2008 Pacific typhoon season
 Typhoon Chan-hom (2015)
 Typhoon Fitow
 Typhoon Sepat

References

External links

JMA General Information of Typhoon Kalmaegi (0807) from Digital Typhoon
JMA Best Track Data of Typhoon Kalmaegi (0807) 
JMA Best Track Data (Graphics) of Typhoon Kalmaegi (0807)
JMA Best Track Data (Text)
JTWC Best Track Data of Typhoon 08W (Kalmaegi)
08W.KALMAEGI from the U.S. Naval Research Laboratory

2008 Pacific typhoon season
H
H
Typhoons in Taiwan
Typhoons in China
Typhoons in South Korea
Typhoons in North Korea
2008 in Taiwan
Typhoons
Kalmaegi